Julius Alfred Chatwin FRIBA, ARBS, FSAScot (24 April 1830 – 6 June 1907) was a British architect. He was involved with the building and modification of many churches in Birmingham, and practised both Neo-Gothic and Neo-Classical styles. His designs always included all of the carvings and internal fittings.

Career 
Born the son of John Chatwin (1796-1855), a button manufacturer in Great Charles Street, Birmingham, and Harriet (1793-1848; née Turner), and educated at King Edward's School on New Street and the University of London, he was known by the name Alfred. He worked from 1846 as an architect for the largest builders in the country, Branson and Gwyther of Birmingham. He was articled to Charles Barry in 1851 and worked with Barry and Augustus Pugin on the Victoria Tower of the Houses of Parliament. He worked again for Gwyther personally on his enterprises in Llandudno, North Wales. In 1855 he opened an office on Bennett's Hill in Birmingham. He was, from 1866, architect to the Governors of King Edward's School and designed the first King Edward VI High School for Girls on New Street. From 1864 he became architect to Lloyds Bank for over thirty years.

From 1866 he worked with his son, Philip Boughton Chatwin (P. B. Chatwin) (1873–1964) who became his partner in 1897.

He was made a Fellow of the Royal Institute of British Architects (FRIBA) on 30 November 1863 and member of the Royal British Society of Sculptors (ARBS), Royal Society of Arts (RSA), and Fellow of the Royal Antiquary Society of Scotland.

He married at St James, Handsworth on 26 October 1869. He is buried with his wife Edith Isabella Chatwin and daughter Isabella Gertrude Chatwin in St Bartholomew's Church, Edgbaston. His gravestone also mentions his daughter Grace Constance Chatwin (cremated).

J.A. Chatwin was the great-grandfather of the writer Bruce Chatwin.

Works 
He designed:
Bingley Hall, 1850, now demolished
School House, Solihull School, 1882, Grade II listed
Most of the north side of Colmore Row after 1866
Birmingham Greek Orthodox Cathedral – Dormition of the Mother of God and St Andrew (built as a Catholic Apostolic church), Grade II listed
St Clement, Nechells Park Road, 1857-9 (his first church)
Holy Trinity Church, Birchfield, 1860-3 Grade II*
The Joint Stock Bank (later Lloyds Bank, now the Old Joint Stock pub and Old Joint Stock Theatre), Temple Row West, 1862–64, Grade II listed
St Matthew's Church, Duddeston and Nechells 1866 addition of galleries to increase seating capacity.
Knutsford Lodge, 25 Somerset Road, Grade II* listed
St Augustine's Church, Edgbaston, 1868, with 185-foot spire added later, Grade II* listed
St Lawrence's Church, Duddeston 1868 (demolished 1951)
St Gabriel's Church, Deritend 1867 – 1869
Christ Church, Summerfield, Edgbaston 1883 – 1885
St. John's Church, Ladywood 1881 new chancel
All Saints' Church, King's Heath 1883 north aisle
St John, Bewdley Road, Kidderminster new nave 1890–94 
King Edward VI Five Ways School 1882 – 1883 
Lloyds Bank, Queen Square, Wolverhampton, Grade II listed (where he is commemorated by a blue plaque)
St Mark's Church, Washwood Heath 1890 – 1899
St Martin in the Bull Ring, (except tower and spire), Grade II* listed
St Mary, Oldswinford, chancel 1898
St Mary, Bearwood Road, Bearwood, 1888
St. Mary's Church, Moseley (rebuilt), Grade II listed
St Mary the Virgin, Acocks Green, chancel 1894
St Mary and St Ambrose, Pershore Road, Edgbaston, (a red brick and terracotta church, 1897–98), Grade II listed
Saints Peter and Paul – Aston Parish Church, 1879, (except tower and spire), Grade II* listed
St. Paul's, Lozells Road, Birmingham
St Philip's Cathedral, Birmingham (enlarged, with new chancel), Grade I listed
School and church, Catherine-de-Barnes, Solihull, 1880
Work on Uppingham School, 1870
St John the Evangelist's Church, Perry Barr 1888 new chancel, vestry and organ chamber
Wolverhampton Art Gallery, 1882, Grade II listed
New Berry Hall,1880 & Berry Hall Lodge, Marsh Lane, Solihull, 1884, Grade II listed
St. Bartholomew's Church, Edgbaston 1885 new chancel, chapels and north arcade.
Church of St. Michael and All Angels, Underwood 1890
Bishop Ryder Church, Birmingham 1894 new chancel
St. John's Church, Kidderminster 1892–1904 new chancel, nave and aisles
 St James' Church, Handsworth 1895; rebuilding
St James' Church, Aston 1906 (demolished 1980)
St Peter's Church, Handsworth 1907

References

Sources 

Blue plaque in Wolverhampton

Incorporated Church Building Society - Church Plans Online

External links
Autographed portrait from Birmingham Images

19th-century English architects
1830 births
1907 deaths
Architects from Birmingham, West Midlands
Alumni of the University of London
People educated at King Edward's School, Birmingham
English ecclesiastical architects
Fellows of the Royal Institute of British Architects
Associates of the Royal British Society of Sculptors
Fellows of the Society of Antiquaries of Scotland